"The Eggplant That Ate Chicago" is a song about alien invasion by Dr. West's Medicine Show and Junk Band. Although often listed as a "one hit wonder", the song did not actually reach the top 40, and its author, Norman Greenbaum, later wrote and performed "Spirit in the Sky" to greater chart success. It was re released on Dr. Demento Presents: The Greatest Novelty Records of All Time, Volume III: The 1960s in 1985.

In Australia, it appeared on the Festival compilation Operation Big Time! in 1967.

Parodies and homages
Tom Paxton's "The Pizza That Ate Chicago" on Fun Food Songs (Delta, 1999) and Your Shoes, My Shoes (2002)
"The Aubergine That Ate Rangoon" on Hawkwind's Astounding Sounds, Amazing Music, 1976
Big Maybelle covered the song on America's Queen Mother of Soul, 2007
Although not strictly following the [foodstuff] that ate [place] formula, there has also been: 
 "The Cockroach That Ate Cincinnati" by Rose and the Arrangement in 1974 and, arguably its homage,
 "Cicada That Ate Five Dock" by Outline, 1981

See also
Attack of the Killer Tomatoes
The Cockroach that Ate Cincinnati

References

1966 songs
1967 singles
Dr. West's Medicine Show and Junk Band songs
Norman Greenbaum songs
Songs about Chicago
Songs about plants